Milton Woods was an actor. He was in several films. In 1946, Newsweek described him as the "colored Basil Rathbone". In 1951, Jet reported that he directed of the American Negro Repertory Theater, touring the country in a trailer.

Filmography
It Happened in Harlem (1945) as Billy Bond
Big Timers (1945)
Beware (1946) as Benjamin Ware III
Reet, Petite, and Gone (1947) as Sam Adams 
Boy! What a Girl! (1947) as Jealous Lover
The Fight Never Ends (1948)
I'll Give My Life (1960) as Kopa, Medical Orderly

References

African-American actors
20th-century American actors

Year of birth missing